Allocasuarina  paradoxa is a woody shrub of the family Casuarinaceae. It is endemic to Victoria in south-eastern Australia, and to South Australia

References

External links
  Occurrence data for Allocasuarina parodoxa from The Australasian Virtual Herbarium

paradoxa
Flora of Victoria (Australia)
Fagales of Australia
Flora of South Australia